Argenton-les-Vallées is a former commune in the Deux-Sèvres department in western France. On 1 January 2016, it was merged into the new commune Argentonnay, and became a delegated commune of Argentonnay. It is situated in the valley of the River Argenton, from which it takes its name.

It was created on 1 September 2006 from the amalgamation of the communes of Argenton-Château, Boësse and Sanzay.

See also
Communes of the Deux-Sèvres department

References

Former communes of Deux-Sèvres
Populated places disestablished in 2016